Milan Belić (born 29 August 1977) is a Serbian football manager and former player.

Club career
Born in Odžaci, Belić started out at Vojvodina in the mid-1990s, becoming a team captain and making 100 league appearances for the club. He subsequently moved to OFK Beograd in June 2002, appearing in just two games, before transferring to Bundesliga side 1. FC Nürnberg that summer.

After a year in Germany, Belić returned to his parent club Vojvodina in 2003. He spent another two seasons with the Lale, before moving abroad for the second time and joining Cypriot side APOP Kinyras. While playing for Anorthosis, Belić won the Cypriot First Division in the 2007–08 campaign.

International career
In January 2001, Belić represented FR Yugoslavia at the Millennium Super Soccer Cup in India, as the team won the tournament. He made two (unofficial) appearances in the process.

Managerial career
In July 2019, Belić was appointed as manager of Serbian League Vojvodina club Bečej. He resigned from his position in September 2020.

Honours
Anorthosis
 Cypriot First Division: 2007–08

References

External links
 
 
 
 

1. FC Nürnberg players
AEK Larnaca FC players
AEP Paphos FC players
Anagennisi Deryneia FC players
Anorthosis Famagusta F.C. players
APOP Kinyras FC players
Association football forwards
Bundesliga players
Cypriot First Division players
Cypriot Second Division players
Ethnikos Achna FC players
Expatriate footballers in Cyprus
Expatriate footballers in Germany
First League of Serbia and Montenegro players
FK Radnički Sombor players
FK Vojvodina players
Nea Salamis Famagusta FC players
OFK Beograd players
Second League of Serbia and Montenegro players
Serbia and Montenegro expatriate footballers
Serbia and Montenegro expatriate sportspeople in Cyprus
Serbia and Montenegro expatriate sportspeople in Germany
Serbia and Montenegro footballers
Serbian expatriate footballers
Serbian expatriate sportspeople in Cyprus
Serbian First League players
Serbian football managers
Serbian footballers
1977 births
Living people
People from Odžaci